is a Japanese manga artist.

Yamashita started her career as a shōjo manga artist. She made her debut as a professional artist in 1980 in the magazine Margaret. In her early years, she was inspired by the style of Mariko Iwadate. She is best known for The Life of Genius Professor Yanagizawa, which is being published in the seinen magazine Morning, and for which she received the 2003 Kodansha Manga Award for general manga. The main character of the manga is modeled after her own father.

For her series Land she received the Grand Prize at the Tezuka Osamu Cultural Prize 2021.

Selected works 
  (1987–1996)
 , (1988–present; on hiatus)
  (2001–2020; on hiatus)
 , 2010–2013
  (2014–2020)

References

External links 
 Official Website 
 

1959 births
Living people
Female comics writers
Japanese female comics artists
Japanese women writers
Japanese writers
Manga artists from Hokkaido
People from Otaru
Winner of Kodansha Manga Award (General)
Winner of Tezuka Osamu Cultural Prize (Grand Prize)
Women manga artists